"In My Heart" is a song by American electronica musician Moby. It was released as the fifth single from his sixth studio album 18 exclusively in France in 2003.

In 2005, the song was featured in commercials for the Nokia Nseries, as well as became as a free-included song on Music Edition of Nokia Nseries.

Track listing 
 CD single 
 "In My Heart" – 4:36
 "And I Know" – 4:45

Charts

References

External links
 

Moby songs
2003 singles
Mute Records singles
Songs written by Moby
2002 songs